Javaid Mustafa Mir (born 24 December 1967) is an Indian politician and a former minister of the erstwhile state of Jammu and Kashmir. He was elected to the  Jammu and Kashmir Legislative Assembly in 2002, 2008 and 2014 from Chadoora. Presently, he is the Vice President of Jammu and Kashmir Apni Party.

Early life and education
Javaid Mustafa Mir was born in a political family in 1967. His father, Mir Mustafa was elected as MLA from Chadoora (Vidhan Sabha constituency) twice in 1987 and 1990. He was abducted and assassinated by the militants after which Javaid started handling his family business until 2002 when his political journey began.

Political career
Javaid Mustafa Mir started his political career in 2002, twelve years after his father's assassination. His father's supporters encouraged Javaid for fighting the 2002 Jammu and Kashmir Legislative Assembly election. He joined Jammu and Kashmir Peoples Democratic Party (PDP) who fielded Javaid from Chadoora (Vidhan Sabha constituency). He contested and won from  Chadoora (Vidhan Sabha constituency) with a huge margin.

After winning the 2002 Assembly elections, he was inducted as the Minister of State for Power Development Department up to 2005. In 2007, he became the Minister of State for Rural Development Department, Panchayati Raj, Science & Technology and Information Technology.

In 2008 the government under the Chief Minister Ghulam Nabi Azad collapsed and in 2008 Jammu and Kashmir Legislative Assembly election, Mir was elected 2nd time MLA from Chadoora (Vidhan Sabha constituency). During this term in the opposition, Mir was known in the Assembly for having a bold voice and as an honest personality.

Javaid again contested in the 2014 Jammu and Kashmir Legislative Assembly election and emerged as a winner for the third term consecutively from Chadoora (Vidhan Sabha constituency). After winning the elections, he was inducted into the PDP-BJP cabinet led by then Chief Minister of Jammu and Kashmir Mufti Mohammad Sayeed and in 2015, became Minister for Revenue, a position that he maintained until January 2016 when the Chief Minister passed away and the government collapsed.

In 2017 he was again inducted into the cabinet as the Minister for Disaster Management & Relief Rehabilitation and Floriculture and was in office until 2018 when the government collapsed after the collation was disbanded.

Javaid left the People's Democratic Party (PDP) in January 2019.

Positions held

References 

20th-century Indian politicians
Living people
Lok Sabha members from Jammu and Kashmir
People from Jammu and Kashmir
1969 births